Rodolfina Gatica Garzón (born 9 July 1965) is a Mexican politician from the Party of the Democratic Revolution. In 2012 she served as Deputy of the LXI Legislature of the Mexican Congress representing Guerrero.

References

1965 births
Living people
Politicians from Guerrero
Women members of the Chamber of Deputies (Mexico)
Party of the Democratic Revolution politicians
21st-century Mexican politicians
21st-century Mexican women politicians
Deputies of the LXI Legislature of Mexico
Members of the Chamber of Deputies (Mexico) for Guerrero